Tarani Sa (born 14 September 1996) is an Indian cricketer. He made his Twenty20 debut on 16 January 2021, for Odisha in the 2020–21 Syed Mushtaq Ali Trophy. He made his List A debut on 28 February 2021, for Odisha in the 2020–21 Vijay Hazare Trophy.

References

External links
 

1996 births
Living people
Indian cricketers
Odisha cricketers
People from Cuttack
Cricketers from Odisha